Big Black Delta is the eponymous album of Mellowdrone vocalist Jonathan Bates' solo project Big Black Delta. It was released in June 2013 under Master of Bates Records.

Track list

References

2013 albums
Big Black Delta albums